Zainul Abideen was a Pakistani politician who served as a member of the Khyber Pakhtunkhwa Assembly and was affiliated with PPP.

References

2016 deaths
Year of birth missing
Members of the Provincial Assembly of Khyber Pakhtunkhwa
People from Chitral
Pakistan People's Party politicians